Esther Rodríguez (born ) is a Spanish female former volleyball player, playing as a libero. She was part of the Spain women's national volleyball team.

She competed at the 2007 Women's European Volleyball Championship.
On club level she played for CAV Murcia 2005 in 2007.

References

External links

1982 births
Living people
Spanish women's volleyball players
Place of birth missing (living people)